American rock band Aerosmith has released 72 singles. Some of their singles have been officially released to the public, while others have been released as album cuts only to radio. Twenty-one of their songs have reached the Top 40 of the Billboard Hot 100 and the band has long been a stalwart of the Mainstream Rock Tracks chart, achieving nine number-one hits on that chart to date. An additional 28 of the band's songs have reached the Top 40 on various charts worldwide. The band has achieved four multi-platinum singles (“Dream On”, “Sweet Emotion”, “Walk This Way”, and “I Don’t Want to Miss a Thing”), while an additional eight singles have attained silver, gold, or platinum certifications in various territories. The band has certified sales of 16.5 million singles in the United States.

Singles

1970s

1980s

1990s

2000s

2010s

Notes
The Mainstream Rock Tracks chart was not created until 1981 and the Top 40 Mainstream chart was not created until the 1990s. Thus, both charts only include material after their creation. 
"Crazy" was released as a double A-side with "Blind Man" in the United Kingdom, so the chart position of #23 is given for both.

Peak positions on other charts
Additionally, the band charted these on other charts:
"Dude (Looks Like a Lady)" (1988) – #41 Dance Music/Club Play
"I Don't Want to Miss a Thing" (1998) – #13 Adult Contemporary, #14 Hot Latin Tracks
"Jaded" (2001) – #8 Top 40 Tracks, #21 Latin Tropical/Salsa Airplay, #30 Latin Pop Airplay
"Fly Away from Here" (2001) – #34 Top 40 Tracks
"Legendary Child" (2012) – #19 Active Rock, #3 Heritage Rock, #27 Hot Rock Songs, #69 Canadian Hot 100 Airplay
"Lover Alot" (2012) – #19 Heritage Rock, #47 Hot Rock Songs
"What Could Have Been Love" (2012) – #28 Adult Contemporary, #48 Hot Rock Songs

See also
Aerosmith albums discography
Aerosmith videography
List of songs recorded by Aerosmith
List of awards and nominations received by Aerosmith
List of artists who reached number one on the Australian singles chart
List of artists who reached number one on the Hot 100 (United States)
List of artists who reached number one on the U.S. Mainstream Rock chart
List of number-one hits (United States)
List of number-one mainstream rock hits (United States)
Joe Perry discography
Steven Tyler discography

References

Discographies of American artists
Rock music group discographies